Kristian Klarskov (born 30 October 1975) is a Danish politician and entrepreneur who was a Member of the Folketing for the Moderates from 1 November 2022 to 23 November 2022.

Career 
Klarskov was elected to the Folketing at the 2022 Danish general election having received 1,772 personal votes.

On 23 November 2022, a week after he was officially sworn in, Klarskov resigned his position as Member of the Folketing. Among other things, Klarskov was accused of faking credentials on his resume and living a fake life of luxury, supposedly funded by several successful startups he had led, in an article published by Jyllands-Posten. One of the companies he had been director of, Wakk Ultrawear, has not had any activity since 2018. Klarskov was replaced by Mohammad Rona.

Personal life 
Klarskov is married and has one child.

References 

Moderates (Denmark) politicians
Members of the Folketing 2022–2026

1975 births

Living people
People from Skagen